Delis Castillo Rivera de Santiago (born ca. 1945) was interim mayor of Ponce from 2004 to 2005.  She filled the post left vacant by the sudden death of long-time Mayor Rafael Cordero Santiago, completing Mayor Cordero Santiago's term.  Prior to filling in the office of mayor, Castillo Rivera was vice-mayor of the municipality.  She is a member of Mu Alpha Phi sorority.

References

See also
 List of mayors of Ponce, Puerto Rico

1940s births

Year of birth uncertain
Living people
Popular Democratic Party (Puerto Rico) politicians
Mayors of Ponce, Puerto Rico
Women mayors of places in Puerto Rico